is designated as a Class A river by the Japanese government with a length of 1.64 km and a basin area of 5.0 km². The open-ditch section of the river is under 2 km in length.

Course
It starts in Nerima Ward, and ends by flowing into the Myōshōji River.

History
The region around the river used to be swampy.

References 

 Weblio.jp

External links
 Riverpromenade.blog

Rivers of Tokyo
Rivers of Japan